At least seven ships of the Imperial Russian and Soviet Navies have been named Poltava after the Russian victory in the Battle of Poltava:

  - 52-gun ship of the line
  - 66-gun ship of the line
  - 66-gun ship of the line
  - 110-gun ship of the line
  - 84-gun ship of the line
  -  pre-dreadnought battleship captured by the Japanese during the Russo-Japanese War of 1904–05, sold back to the Russians during World War I, renamed Chesma as there was a new Poltava in the Russian Navy, and ultimately scrapped by the Soviets in 1924
  -  that participated in World War I and World War II before being scrapped in 1949

Russian Navy ship names